The Shen'ao line is a 4.6 km long, single-track railway branch line of the Taiwan Railways Administration. It runs through Ruifang in New Taipei and Zhongzheng in Keelung.

History
The railroad was originally built on 25 August 1967. The line was initially built to transport coal but later added a passenger service, though passenger service was discontinued 1989. It then opened again in 2016, but the extending line from Badouzi Station onwards was disused.

Services
All trains have through service to the Yilan line.

Stations

References

1967 establishments in Taiwan
TRA routes
Railway lines opened in 1967
3 ft 6 in gauge railways in Taiwan